is a Japanese anime television series, created and written by Shō Aikawa and produced by Bones. Directed by Hiroshi Nishikiori, it featured character designs by Toshihiro Kawamoto. It was broadcast for twenty-five episodes on MBS–TBS from October 2006 to March 2007.

Plot

Characters

Ayashi of the Bansha Aratamesho

An almost 41-year-old drifter with the power of Ayagami. He goes by the name of "Yuki". Originally a son of a Hatamoto Samurai, he left home 25 years ago, after having visited the "Other World". He vanished from home when he was 15 and re-appeared a year later. To him it seemed that an instant went by and came to in the same room he had been in when he first left. He is the only person known to have visited it and returned. He later thanks his mother for the 15 years she spent with him, though he has spent 25 years away from home he can not agree to return and be the head of the family. Because of his time away in the Other World he found himself unable to appreciate human food and places and felt dissatisfied with the normal world. However he knows that he must remain in this world and feels persecuted by the Other World and that is why he became a drifter, never staying in one place for more than a year. Most importantly, he was left with the power of Ayagami, which allows him to draw out a creature's true name and turn it into a weapon.
Fifteen years ago, he met and befriended a man named Kumoshichi who goaded him into fights and gambling. Kumoshichi was in a relationship with Oshino who cared deeply of him and hoped to marry. At one point Yukiatsu and Kumoshichi had an argument and Yukiatsu was forced to kill him in self-defense. The event was so traumatic that Yukiatsu blocked out the memories, and unconsciously summoned a Yoi in Kumoshichi's form. At some point he was brought to the vagrant camps, escaped, was recaptured, and escaped again; his arm and shoulder are still tattooed from this.
After he returned from the Other World, Yukiatsu was very reckless and rambunctious. He had trained and become a samurai as a child, later became a ronin and then worked as a bodyguard. Because of his high fighting skills, he started fights, tricked people in gambling, and sexually harassed Oshino because he was desperate to feel alive. This was the cause for the fight between Yukiatsu and Kumoshichi. After losing his friend, he became much more quiet and restrained. Because of his status as an eternal outsider, from society and from the human race, Yukiatsu tends to be extremely sympathetic to people who fall outside the bounds of society, whether they are vagrants or foreigners.

The 20-year-old leader of the Ayashi of the Bansha Aratamesho. He often finds himself torn between his Ayashi work and the government's political schemes.

A cross-dressing Shinto priest. His appearance and mannerisms are so convincingly feminine that despite his masculine voice, he is often mistaken for a girl. His cross-dressing is not due to his sexuality or preference, but rather to an enduring family tradition of having priests who dressed as women during rituals. Genbatsu apparently frequents the geisha district, and has many female friends there.
He fights using several different firearms, ranging from a large gun to a bazooka and grenades, and seems to function more as a munitions expert than as a priest. He frequently works alongside Abi, and the two seem to be very close friends (even drinking and partying together).

A young girl who dresses as a boy because of her background in the theatre, where women are not allowed to perform. Saizo was also raised to be as masculine as possible by her homosexual father, who died in a fire after Saizo accidentally walked in on him and his lover. She believed her father hated her because her name is seemingly related to the word for "sin." As a result, she is secretly tormented by the belief that she herself is inherently sinful.
She fights using a paper fan which unfolds to become a long rope of paper, which can be used to temporarily tie up Yoi. She was also trained by her father from a very young age to perform a mysterious dance which attracts Yōi, which is said to be the dance performed to draw the goddess Amaterasu from her cave.
Though it was not explicitly mentioned, there were implications that she is around fourteen years old when she said she was not even born fifteen years ago, and that she turned thirteen at the same time when her father started turning on other actors before the theatre burned down, which occurred a year ago.

A man from the Emishi mountain people, fights using a spear which can split mid-throw into five lesser, seemingly magical spears. He seems to have a close relationship with Genbatsu, perhaps because of their similar temperaments. He is extremely tall, muscular and darker-skinned than his friends, and tends to be dressed more roughly.

South Edo Magistrate

The South Edo Magistrate, Lord of "Kai". A strong supporter of the Chief Elder Mizuno Tadakuni Tenpo Reforms.

A retainer of Torii Yōzō. He works under him as spy.

A Rangaku scholar.

A relative of Honjō Tatsusuke. She is revealed to have gone to the Other World and returned, giving her the ability to breed the Yokai-like creatures the Magistrate use as a task force against other Yokai.

Shogunate government

Biological brother of Mizuno Tadakuni, the financial magistrate and political opponent of Torii Yōzō. Ogasawara's superior.

Appointed as Elder at age 25. He negotiated on behalf of the Shogun government with Matthew Perry.

Recently been dismissed from the post of North Edo Magistrate and has been transferred to the post of Chief Censor. Political opponent of Torii Yōzō.

Other characters

An Aztec girl who works in a circus alongside her massive horse, . Atl was born in Mexico and was orphaned while living in Texas with her family; when she prayed to the Aztec god Quetzacoatl, she summoned a Yoi in the form of a horse that could also become a dragon. Since she had heard from some samurai stranded in North America about Japan, she decided to go there in hopes of finding a peaceful home.
However, Atl was reviled for being a foreigner, and had to artificially tint her bronze skin with makeup to pass for a Japanese person. She and her horse Quetzl (whom she called Yukiwa) performed together in a circus, until her status as a foreigner was revealed. After this, Genbatsu arranged for her to be a ward of the geishas he knew in the red light district, although she herself would not become one.
For reasons that are never fully explored, Atl is able to see Kumoshichi, and is able to correctly identify him as a Yoi despite his human appearance. No one other than Yukiatsu is able to do so.

Yuki's friend, whom nobody except Yuki can see. The real Kumoshichi was Shikiji, a man who Yuki knew about fifteen years ago. However, he attempted to snap Yuki out of his self-destructive haze by tricking and goading him into a life-or-death fight, and forcing Yuki to stab him in self-defense. Yuki blocked out the entire incident, and unconsciously created a Yoi in Shikiji's form. After this, Kumoshichi followed Yuki everywhere and often would give him advice.
Yuki was shocked when he realized that he had killed the real Shikiji, and that his longtime friend was actually a Yoi he had created. When the horse/dragon Quetzl began running wild, Kumoshichi merged with him and successfully calmed the Yoi until it was no longer dangerous. As a result, Kumoshichi only existed after that as a part of Quetzl - a talking horse.

A youngster offered in sacrifice to a Yōi by his father, but then escaped with his mother. Ota was supposedly going to be a sacrifice to the mountain god near his village due to a bad rice harvest-(as it had caused a lot of people in his hometown to starve and die from malnutrition), but it seems to be implied that his father intended to kill and eat him instead (having done the same to the boy's older sister). When the mountain god appeared and absorbed Ota's father, the boy was exposed to the Other World. His mother Tae took him on the run to escape the Yoi, but the boy kept searching for the Other World because of the hardships of this one; after meeting and talking with Yukiatsu, he decides to stay with his mother in the real world.

Ōta's mother, who goes on the run to avoid the mountain god that wants her son. She is attracted to Yukiatsu and seems hopeful of marrying him at one time, but eventually settles down in another city with her son.

A bumbling auxiliary policeman (Okappiki) obsessed with catching Yuki.

A group of masked bandits whose goals are a mystery. Like Ryūdo, they can use Ayagami and often create Yōi. They are led by a man called Akamatsu, who has an X-shaped scar on his face.
, also known as 

A young painter with remarkable talent. He was once sent briefly to the Other World after he grabbed a severed head which was floating down the river and nearly drowned. He is confident and self-assured beyond his years. He often visits brothels despite being underage, claiming (perhaps truthfully) that he is there to practice his observational art, and because he developed some interest on Atl. He proved to be useful to the Ayashi providing reliable information and protecting Atl from harm in their absence.

Broadcast and release

Ghost Slayers Ayashi first aired in Japan on October 7, 2006 in the 6pm Saturday prime-time slot on MBS and TBS. It was originally slated to be 52 episodes; however, due to low ratings during its broadcast run, the series' length was cut in half, to 25 episodes. From episodes 1-12, the opening theme is "Ryūsei Miracle" by Ikimono-gakari while the ending theme is "Winding Road" by Porno Graffitti. From episodes 13–25, the opening theme is "Lone Star" by Captain Straydum, while the ending theme is "Ai Toiu Kotoba" by Saki.

A five-part OVAs titled Tenpō Ibun Ayakashi Ayashi: Inferno were released, set six months after the events of the TV series.

Manga adaptation
A manga adaptation by Yaeko Ninagawa was serialized in Square Enix's seinen manga magazine Young Gangan from September 15, 2006, to July 20, 2007. Square Enix collected its chapters in two tankōbon volumes, released on February 24 and October 25, 2007.

In North America, the manga was licensed for English release by Bandai Entertainment. The volumes were released on September 16 and December 16, 2008.

See also
Bansha no goku

References

 "Tenpo Ibun Ayakashi Ayashi". (November 2006) Newtype USA. p. 15.

External links
 Official website
 Bones' official site for Tenpō Ibun Ayakashi Ayashi
 MBS' official website for Tenpō Ibun Ayakashi Ayashi
 Animax's official website for Tenpō Ibun Ayakashi Ayashi
 

2006 anime television series debuts
2006 manga
2007 anime OVAs
Anime with original screenplays
Aniplex
Bandai Entertainment anime titles
Bandai Entertainment manga titles
Bones (studio)
Films with screenplays by Shō Aikawa
Gangan Comics manga
Historical fantasy anime and manga
Mainichi Broadcasting System original programming
Seinen manga
Television shows about exorcism
Yōkai in anime and manga